Mike City (born Michael Flowers) is an American singer, songwriter and record producer. He is best known for producing the singles "I Wish" for Carl Thomas, "Heard It All Before" for Sunshine Anderson, "Full Moon" for Brandy and "One Woman Man" for Dave Hollister.

Career
He became a mentor of Anderson's after a friend discovered her singing a song by Lalah Hathaway in the cafeteria line at North Carolina Central University.

He earned the moniker "Mike City" because he was an avid listener of the house music group Ten City. Initially a songwriter, City became a singer by trade and later a producer after needing an outlet to use the songs he wrote. He started out playing drums and bass, but switched to keyboards after graduating from high school in 1987.

Flowers is also the founder and CEO of Unsung Entertainment, Inc. He is also a member of Iota Phi Theta fraternity, a predominantly African-American national fraternity. He was initiated at Alpha Epsilon Chapter at North Carolina Central University in Spring 1988.

He is noted for production on Brandy's albums Full Moon and Two Eleven.

In 2015, he began a new music project called Lewis City alongside British house and garage producer Danny J Lewis. In 2017, he released his house music inspired second album The Feel Good Agenda, Vol. 1.

Discography

Studio albums
 City Life (1998)
 The Feel Good Agenda, Vol. 1 (2017)

Production credits
Channel Live – Armaghetto (2000)
Carl Thomas – Emotional (2000)
Dave Hollister – Chicago '85... The Movie (2000)
02. "Keep On Lovin'"
04. "One Woman Man"
Usher – 8701 (2001)
Yolanda Adams – Believe (2001)
Babyface – Face 2 Face (2001)
01. "Outside In/Inside Out"
Bilal Oliver – 1st Born Second (2001)
Brandy – Osmosis Jones (soundtrack) (2001)
Gerald Levert – Gerald's World (2001)
Jimmy Cozier – Jimmy Cozier (2001)
Nate Dogg – Music & Me (2001)
Ras Kass – Van Gogh (2001)
Rell – If That's My Baby (single) (2001)
Ruff Ryders – Ryde or Die Vol. 3: In the "R" We Trust (2001)
Sunshine Anderson – Your Woman (2001)
Brandy – Full Moon (2002)
Mary Mary – Incredible (2002)
Nappy Roots – Watermelon, Chicken & Gritz (2002)
Ras Kass – Goldyn Chyld (2002)
Dave Hollister – Things in the Game Done Changed (2002)
Kelly Price – Priceless (2003)
03. You Make Me Feel
13. I Live Here Now
LSG – LSG2 (2003)
06. Playing with Fire
Blu Cantrell – Bittersweet (2003)
12. No Place Like Home
Calvin Richardson – 2:35 P.M. (2003)
12. Cross My Heart
Nappy Roots – Wooden Leather (2003)
702 – Star (2003)
Carl Thomas – Let's Talk About It (2004)
06. Make It Alright
Rahsaan Patterson – After Hours
12. Forever Yours (2004)
JoJo – JoJo (2004)
04. The Happy Song
Jon B. – Stronger Everyday (2004)
05. Hands On U
Gerald Levert – Do I Speak for the World (2004)
14. Where Do We Go
Lalah Hathaway- Outrun the Sky (2004)
01. How Many Times
03. Your Favorite Song
05. Better And Better
Brandy – Afrodisiac (Special Edition) (2004)
16. Like It Was Yesterday
Anthony Hamilton – Soulife (2005)
09. Last Night
Yolanda Adams – Day by Day (2005)
11. I'm Grateful
Dwele – Some Kinda... (2005)
09. I Think I Love U
Jamie Foxx – Unpredictable (2005)
07. Extravaganza
09. Get This Money
Shanice – Every Woman Dreams (2006)
08. That's Why I Love You
Urban Mystic – Ghetto Revelations II (2006)
10. When U Hurt
Rihanna – A Girl Like Me (2006)
05. Dem Haters
Donell Jones – Journey of a Gemini (2006)
05. Spend the Night
09. Lust or Love
Chris Brown – "You" (2006)
Defari – Street Music (2006)
3LW – Point of No Return (2006)
00. Strictly Business
00. Keep It Sexy
00. Fall Back
Dave Hollister – The Book of David: Vol. 1 – The Transition (2006)
Sunshine Anderson – Sunshine at Midnight (2006)
Carl Thomas – So Much Better (2007)
Keith Murray – Rap-Murr-Phobia (2007)
04. Don't Fuck wit 'Em
Brandy – Human (2008)
Heavy D. – Vibes (2008)
06. Hugs and Kisses
KeAnthony – A Hustlaz Story (2008)
12. It's Okay
Musiq Soulchild – "Say It Ain't So" (2008)
Urban Mystic – GRIII: Old Skool 2 Nu Skool (2009)
12. It Wasn't Me
Mack 10 – Soft White (2009)
07. "Street Shit" (featuring Glasses Malone)
Dwele – W.ants W.orld W.omen (2010)
Donell Jones – Lyrics (2010)
10. The Finer Things in Life
Faith Evans – Something About Faith (2010)
Sunshine Anderson – The Sun Shines Again (2010)
El DeBarge – Second Chance (2010)
01. Lay With You (featuring Faith Evans)
03. Close to You
07. Serenading
Avant – The Letter (2010)
06. Nightlife
Ledisi – Pieces of Me (2011)
07. Shut Up
Lalah Hathaway – Where It All Begins (2011)
06. Always Love You
13. My Heart (iTunes bonus track)
Anthony Hamilton – Back to Love (2011)
02. Writing on the Wall
Carl Thomas- Conquer (2011)
05. It's Not The Same
09. Sweet Love
Mark Morrison – I Am What I Am (2011)
TBR. B'Day ft. Trina
TBR. B'Day (Remix) ft.Warren G
Dwele – Greater Than One (2012) 
05. "What Profit"
11. "Special"
Mashonda – Love, Mashonda (2012)
04. Touch Me
Faith Evans featuring Nicci Gilbert & Helene "Mom" Gilbert – R&B Divas (2012)
07. Sometimes
Brandy – Two Eleven (Deluxe Edition) (2012)
15. Music
Angie Stone – Rich Girl (2012)
03. Backup Plan
11. Right in Front of Me
Maysa – Blue Velvet Soul (2013)
13. This Much
Leela James – Fall for You (2014)
03. Give It
Faith Evans – Incomparable (2014)
02. Extraordinary
14. Paradise
Ameriie – Drive (2016)
04. Trouble with Love

References

External links
Official website
Official Myspace
Mike City 2012 audio interview
Fatal Son interview with Platinum producer Mike City

Living people
Year of birth missing (living people)
African-American record producers
Record producers from Pennsylvania
African-American male singer-songwriters
American music industry executives
Musicians from Charlotte, North Carolina
Musicians from Philadelphia
Singer-songwriters from Pennsylvania
21st-century African-American male singers
Singer-songwriters from North Carolina